Kyiso (c. 1000–1038) was a king of the Pagan dynasty from 1021 to 1038. According to the Burmese chronicles, Kyiso was a son of King Nyaung-u Sawrahan but raised by King Kunhsaw Kyaunghpyu. Kunhsaw married Nyuang-u's three chief queens, two of whom were pregnant and subsequently gave birth to Kyiso and Sokkate. Sokkate and Kyiso were raised by Kunhsaw as his own sons. When the two sons reached manhood, they forced Kunhsaw to abdicate the throne and become a monk.

Kyiso was an avid hunter, and was killed in a hunting accident near Monywa. He became Yoma Shin Mingaung Nat or a spirit in Burmese folk religion.

Dates
Various chronicles do not agree on the dates regarding his life and reign. The oldest chronicle Zatadawbon Yazawin is considered to be the most accurate for the Pagan period. The table below lists the dates given by four main chronicles, as well as Hmannan's dates when anchored by the Anawrahta's inscriptionally verified accession date of 1044. The length of reign for Kyiso is given as 17 years by Zata but as six years by the others. According to Zata, it was Sokkate, the successor of Kyiso, who ruled for six years.

Notes

References

Bibliography
 
 
 
 
 

Pagan dynasty
1000s births
1038 deaths
11th-century Burmese monarchs

Year of birth uncertain